Hardeman County is a county located in the U.S. state of Texas. As of the 2020 census, its population was 3,549. The county seat and largest city is Quanah. The county was created in 1858 and later organized in 1884. It is named for two brothers, Bailey Hardeman and Thomas Jones Hardeman, early Texas politicians and legislators. Hardeman County was one of 46 prohibition or entirely dry counties in the state of Texas until November 2006, when voters approved referendums to permit the legal sale of alcoholic beverages for on- and off-premises consumption.

Geography

The Prairie Dog Town Fork Red River joins with Buck Creek in the northwestern corner of the county to form the Red River, which flows east to form the northern border of the county, separating it from Oklahoma.

Hardeman County is the northernmost county in Texas that is not part of the Texas Panhandle.

Major highways
  U.S. Highway 287
  State Highway 6

Adjacent counties
 Harmon County, Oklahoma (north)
 Jackson County, Oklahoma (northeast)
 Wilbarger County (east)
 Foard County (south)
 Cottle County (southwest)
 Childress County (west)

Demographics

Note: the US Census treats Hispanic/Latino as an ethnic category. This table excludes Latinos from the racial categories and assigns them to a separate category. Hispanics/Latinos can be of any race.

As of the census of 2000, 4,724 people, 1,943 households, and 1,319 families were residing in the county.  The population density was 7 people per mi2 (3/km2).  The 2,358 housing units averaged 3 per mi2 (1/km2).  The racial makeup of the county was 85.4% White, 4.8% African American, 0.8% Native American, 0.3% Asian, 7.1% from other races, and 1.6% from two or more races.  About 14.5% of the population were Hispanic or Latino of any race.

Of the 1,943 households, 29.9% had children under the age of 18 living with them, 54.7% were married couples living together, 10.4% had a female householder with no husband present, and 32.1% were not families. About 29.5% of all households were made up of individuals, and 18.0% had someone living alone who was 65 years of age or older.  The average household size was 2.40, and the average family size was 2.97.

In the county, the population distribution was 25.40% under the age of 18, 7.50% from 18 to 24, 22.60% from 25 to 44, 24.30% from 45 to 64, and 20.20% who were 65 years of age or older.  The median age was 41 years. For every 100 females, there were 89.40 males.  For every 100 females age 18 and over, there were 85.2 males.

The median income for a household in the county was $28,312, and for a family was $33,325. Males had a median income of $26,683 versus $18,566 for females. The per capita income for the county was $16,824.  About 14.6% of families and 17.8% of the population were below the poverty line, including 26.0% of those under age 18 and 13.4% of those age 65 or over.

Economy

Attractions
The park features a portion of the state Texas Longhorn herd.

Communities

Cities
 Chillicothe
 Quanah (county seat)

Unincorporated communities
 Goodlett

Ghost towns
 Acme
 Medicine Mound

Politics
Republican Drew Springer, Jr., a businessman from Muenster in Cooke C
ounty, has represented Hardeman County in the Texas Senate since 2021, and previously in the Texas House of Representatives from 2013 to 2021.
Hardeman County formerly leaned Democratic, however in recent years it has swung to become solidly Republican.

https://en.wikipedia.org/w/index.php?title=Hardeman_County,_Texas&action=edit

Education
School districts serving sections of the county include:
 Childress Independent School District
 Chillicothe Independent School District
 Quanah Independent School District

The county is in the service area of Vernon College.

See also

 Dry counties
 List of museums in North Texas
 National Register of Historic Places listings in Hardeman County, Texas
 Recorded Texas Historic Landmarks in Hardeman County
 Hardeman County, Tennessee

References

External links

 Texas Cooperative Extension, Hardeman County office
 Texas School Districts: School Districts in Hardeman County
 
 Hardeman County profile from the Texas Association of Counties
 Historic Hardeman County materials, hosted by the Portal to Texas History

 
1884 establishments in Texas
Populated places established in 1884